Bamford v Turnley (1860) 3 B & S 62; 122 ER 25, is an English tort law case concerning nuisance and what it means to be a reasonable user of land.

Facts
The defendants burnt bricks in a kiln and this sent noxious fumes to the surrounding country, affecting various neighbours. It made them and their servants ill. They sued to prevent the nuisance.

At first instance it was held that the brick smoke was reasonable because the defendant had only been using the kiln in order to build a home.

Judgment
Bramwell B held that the defendants had to pay compensation. Responding to the argument that if land is being reasonably used in itself, then there is a public interest that it should be carried on Bramwell B went on…

See also
Kaldor-Hicks efficiency

English tort case law
Baron Bramwell cases
English nuisance cases
1860 in case law
1860 in British law
Court of Exchequer Chamber cases